"All I Wanna Do Is Make Love to You" is a song by American rock band Heart. It was composed by veteran songwriter and producer Robert John "Mutt" Lange and released as the lead single from the band's tenth studio album, Brigade, in March 1990. The song was first recorded as "All I Want to Do Is Make Love to You" by Dobie Gray in 1979, though with different lyrics. The Heart version tells the story of a woman who sets out to seduce a hitchhiker in order to become pregnant because although there is a man in her life, he is infertile.

"All I Wanna Do Is Make Love to You" was a success, spending two weeks at number two on the US Billboard Hot 100, behind "Vogue" by Madonna, peaking at number eight in the UK Singles Chart, (becoming their last top ten in the US and UK), and reaching number one in Canada and Australia. It was also nominated for a Grammy Award for Best Group Pop Vocal Performance, and is the only one of Heart's singles to have been certified Gold by the RIAA. On the Adult Contemporary chart, the song climbed to number six, becoming the third of Heart's four top-ten AC hits (after "These Dreams" and "Alone").

The single was Heart's last pop chart top ten hit in the US to date. The band had one more top ten Adult Contemporary chart hit with the follow-up, "Stranded"; "Stranded" and two singles from 1994's Desire Walks On ("Black on Black II" and "Will You Be There (In The Morning)") were also top 10 Album Rock chart hits.

Background
In the liner notes of Heart's album The Road Home, Ann Wilson commented on the band's dislike for the song, stating, "Actually we had sworn off it because it kind of stood for everything we wanted to get away from. It was a song by 'Mutt' Lange, who we liked, and it was originally written for Don Henley, but there was a lot of pressure on us to do the song at the time." Ann Wilson has made a number of comments on her dislike for the song, calling the song's message "hideous" in an interview with Dan Rather.  In that same interview, Ann mentions that she's surprised at how many of their fans, especially in Australia and New Zealand, want to hear the song to this day when Heart plays live. Although Heart does not perform this song any more due to Ann's dislike of it, Ann did eventually perform this song on her 2017 tour, though her version of the song had a few changes.

The 7-inch single features an edited 4:29 version of the album track (5:10). The 12-inch and CD versions featured the non-LP track "Cruel Tears". In the UK, a very limited 'tour edition' 12-inch single was released, on clear vinyl.

Content
The original song as recorded by Dobie Gray in 1979 was a love song without a storyline, unlike the later version by Heart.

In the Heart version of the song, which is also played out in the accompanying music video, interspersed with sequences of the band performing the song, singer Ann Wilson sings of a one-night stand with a handsome young male hitchhiker. After an implicit agreement to remain anonymous, they make their way to a hotel room in which to have sex. The lyrics make the suggestion that this may not be the first time the female protagonist has engaged in such behaviors, noting her familiarity with this particular hotel. The song explicitly highlights the sexual prowess of the young man, and his ability to easily and repeatedly bring the female protagonist to orgasm. She leaves a note with instructions for the man to make no attempt to contact her or track her down. It is subsequently revealed that her intent all along was to use the encounter as a way to become pregnant. The lyrics explain later, when she accidentally crosses paths with the one-time lover, that her baby is the result of their tryst and she did it only because the man she is in love with is not able to father children.

Charts and certifications

Weekly charts

Year-end charts

Decade-end charts

Certifications

Release history

Halestorm versions
Halestorm has covered "All I Wanna Do Is Make Love to You" multiple times live and released a studio version on their Reanimate: The Covers EP album. The music video was directed by Andy Morahan and shot by Mike Southon. "We covered 'All I Wanna Do Is Make Love to You' very carefully, because you don't want to ruin a Heart song," remarked Lzzy Hale. "It's a very underrated track. I did it like that first version I heard on [Heart's 1995 album] The Road Home."

References

1979 songs
1990 singles
1990s ballads
Capitol Records singles
Cashbox number-one singles
Heart (band) songs
Number-one singles in Australia
Pop ballads
Rock ballads
RPM Top Singles number-one singles
Song recordings produced by Richie Zito
Songs about casual sex
Songs written by Robert John "Mutt" Lange
Songs about pregnancy